Bruce Anthony Reid (born 14 March 1963) is a former Australian international cricketer.

Domestic career
Reid played for Western Australia in the Sheffield Shield from 1984–85 to 1995–96.

International career

Reid represented Australia in Test cricket between December 1985 and December 1992 and in One Day Internationals between January 1986 and March 1992. He played 27 Test matches for Australia taking 113 Test wickets at an average of 24.63 runs per wicket. He also played 61 ODIs, taking 63 wickets. 

Reid bowled left-arm fast-medium and had natural swing and an awkward angle of delivery. He achieved steepling bounce from his great height and was very accurate. Reid made his debut against India in January 1986. He was a mainstay of the Australian bowling attack from that time on. However, during Australia's tour of Pakistan in 1988 he suffered a back injury. Thereafter, Reid was frequently injured and was rarely fully fit, which limited his international career. In the 1990–91 Ashes series against England he took 27 wickets at an average of 16.00 in the first four Tests and won the award for player of the series, despite missing the last Test due to injury.

Trivia

Post-playing career
Since retirement as a player, Reid has developed a career as a bowling coach, and worked with teams around the world including the India cricket team (during the 2003–04 tour of Australia), the Zimbabwe national team and Hampshire County Cricket Club. He has also mentored Australian fast bowlers, including Nathan Bracken.

Personal life
Reid was born in Osborne Park, a suburb of Perth, Western Australia. He was a cousin of New Zealand batsman John Reid.

References

Further reading

External links

1963 births
Living people
Australia One Day International cricketers
One Day International hat-trick takers
Cricketers at the 1987 Cricket World Cup
Cricketers at the 1992 Cricket World Cup
Australia Test cricketers
Australian cricket coaches
Western Australia cricketers
Western Australian Sports Star of the Year winners
Australian cricketers
Cricketers from Perth, Western Australia